The Ishbel Group is a stratigraphic unit of Permian age in the Western Canadian Sedimentary Basin. It is present in the Canadian Rockies of Alberta and British Columbia. First defined by A. McGugan in 1963, it is named for Mount Ishbel of the Sawback Range in Banff National Park, and parts of the group were first described in the vicinity of the mountain at Ranger Canyon and Johnston Canyon.

Lithology
The Ishbel Group is composed of carbonate rocks (limestone and dolomite) and sandstone, with minor chert and siltstone.
 Depositional conditions were similar to those of the Phosphoria Formation to the south in United States.

Paleontology
Among the fossils that have been found in the Ishbel Group are corals, bryozoa, crinoids, and conodonts, as well as productid, chonetid and spiriferid brachiopods, omphalotrochid gastropods, and edestid elasmobranch fish.

Distribution
The Ishbel Group reaches a maximum thickness of up to about 425 metres (1400 ft). It is present in the front ranges of the Canadian Rockies as far north as the Peace River.

Subdivisions

Relationship to other units
The Ishbel Group is disnconformably overlain by the Spray River Group and unconformably overlies the Tunnel Mountain Formation and the Kananaskis Formation. It is partly equivalent to the Phosphoria Formation of Montana, Idaho, Wyoming, and Utah.

References

Stratigraphy of British Columbia
Stratigraphy of the Northwest Territories
Stratigraphy of Alberta
Permian northern paleotemperate deposits